The women's 100 metres event at the 2006 Commonwealth Games was held on March 19–20.

Medalists

Results

Heats
Qualification: First 3 of each heat (Q) and the next 9 fastest (q) qualified for the semifinals.

Wind:Heat 1: 0.0 m/s, Heat 2: +0.5 m/s, Heat 3: +1.6 m/s, Heat 4: +0.6 m/s, Heat 5: +1.2 m/s

Semifinals
Qualification: First 2 of each semifinal (Q) and the next 2 fastest (q) qualified for the final.

Wind:Heat 1: +1.4 m/s, Heat 2: –0.3 m/s, Heat 3: +1.9 m/s

Final
Wind: +0.2 m/s

References
Results

100
2006
2006 in women's athletics